Isabella Borremans was a Flemish opera singer and stage actor.

She was the leading female actor of the Flemish language theatre, Opéra flamand, created by director Ignaz Vitzthumb at the La Monnaie in Brussels in 1772–1776. This was the first professional Flemish language theatre and opera in Brussels, and she was its star actress. She mainly played heroine roles as 'premiere amoureuse en chef aux Flamands', and the first Flemish woman in this position in Brussels, were actresses were otherwise French.

References
 Bram Van Oostveldt:  The Theatre de la Monnaie and Theatre Life in the 18th Century Austrian ... ... 

Actors of the Austrian Netherlands
18th-century opera singers
18th-century actresses
Musicians of the Austrian Netherlands
Women of the Austrian Netherlands